Barrie Pigot (3 August 1938 – 21 June 2008) was an Australian rules footballer who played for the Fitzroy Football Club in the Victorian Football League (VFL).

Notes

External links 
		

1938 births
2008 deaths
Australian rules footballers from Victoria (Australia)
Fitzroy Football Club players